The 2020 European Championship C  was a planned international rugby league tournament that would have taken place in October and November 2020.

Background
In April 2021, after initially being postponed due to the COVID-19 pandemic, the 2020 tournament, which was originally postponed until 2021, was cancelled due to COVID-19 restrictions in Germany and Norway prevented the competition taking-place. Three teams were to compete in the tournament, down from the six that participated in the 2018–19 edition. The three teams are Germany, Norway, and Ukraine.

The tournament was intended to be postponed to 2022, but was never played.

Participants

Original fixture 
{{rugbyleaguebox
| event     = 2020 European Championship C
|date=17–18 October 2020
|time=
|team1=
|score=
|report=Report
|team2=
|try1=
|goal1=
|try2=
|goal2=
|stadium=
|attendance=
|referee=}}

{{rugbyleaguebox
| event     = 2020 European Championship C
|date=24–25 October 2020
|time=
|team1=
|score=
|report=Report
|team2=
|try1=
|goal1=
|try2=
|goal2=
|stadium=
|attendance=
|referee=}}

{{rugbyleaguebox
| event     = 2020 European Championship C
|date=31 October–1 November 2020
|time=
|team1=
|score=
|report=Report
|team2=
|try1=
|goal1=
|try2=
|goal2=
|stadium=
|attendance=
|referee=}}

References 

European rugby league competitions
2020 in rugby league